Joseph Ellison McIntosh (born December 9, 1962) is a former American football running back who played one season with the Atlanta Falcons of the National Football League. He was drafted by the Detroit Lions in the fifth round of the 1985 NFL Draft. He played college football at North Carolina State University and attended Lexington Senior High School in Lexington, North Carolina.

References

External links
Just Sports Stats
College stats

Living people
1962 births
Players of American football from North Carolina
American football running backs
African-American players of American football
NC State Wolfpack football players
Atlanta Falcons players
People from Lexington, North Carolina
National Football League replacement players